Kenneth Frederick Desjardine (born August 23, 1947) is a Canadian retired professional ice hockey defenceman who played 154 games in the World Hockey Association for the Indianapolis Racers, Calgary Cowboys, and Quebec Nordiques.

External links

1947 births
Living people
Calgary Cowboys players
Canadian ice hockey defencemen
Ice hockey people from Toronto
Indianapolis Racers players
Michigan Tech Huskies men's ice hockey players
Quebec Nordiques (WHA) players